Atkinson Township may refer to:

 Atkinson Township, Henry County, Illinois
 Atkinson Township, Carlton County, Minnesota
 Atkinson Township, Holt County, Nebraska

Township name disambiguation pages